IFK Uppsala is a Swedish football club, and the football section (the other one is bandy) of IFK Uppsala, located in Uppsala. The club, formed 1895, was one of the leading Swedish clubs in the early 20th century. They played two seasons in the highest league at the time, Svenska Serien, and also played three Swedish Championship finals, losing all. IFK Uppsala currently plays in the lower leagues of Swedish football.

Achievements 
Svenska Mästerskapet:
Runners-up (3): 1907, 1908, 1911
Corinthian Bowl:
Runners-up (1): 1909
Kamratmästerskapen:
Runners-up (1): 1902

External links
IFK Uppsala – official site

 
Football clubs in Uppsala County
Football
Association football clubs established in 1895
Sport in Uppsala County
1895 establishments in Sweden